Gereldo George (born 24 December 1994) is a South African cricketer who currently plays for Boland. He is a right-handed batsman and right-arm off break bowler. Botha made his first-class debut on 8 October 2015 against Namibia.

He was included in the Boland cricket team squad for the 2015 Africa T20 Cup. Boland head coach Johann Louw called him "a mystery spinner who turns the ball both ways".

References

External links
 Gereldo George profile at CricketArchive
 Gereldo George profile at Cricinfo

1994 births
Living people
People from Bergrivier Local Municipality
South African cricketers
Boland cricketers